Nickel formate is the nickel salt of formic acid with the chemical formula Ni(HCOO)2.

Synthesis and structure 
Nickel formate can be obtained by reacting nickel(II) acetate or nickel(II) hydroxide  with formic acid.

Ni(OH)2 + 2HCOOH → Ni(HCOO)2 + 2 H2O

Nickel formate can also be synthesized by the reaction of sodium formate with nickel (II) sulphate.

Characteristics 
As a dihydrate, nickel formate is a green, odorless, non-flammable solid that is sparingly soluble in water. The compound has a monoclinic crystal structure. The anhydride forms on careful heating at 130–140 °C.  When heated in a vacuum to 300 °C, pure nickel is formed:

Such fine powders are useful as hydrogenation catalysts.

Use 
Nickel formate is used in the production of nickel and other nickel compounds such as nickel catalysts.

References 

Formates
Nickel compounds